
Gmina Kłaj is a rural gmina (administrative district) in Wieliczka County, Lesser Poland Voivodeship, in southern Poland.

Villages
Gmina Kłaj contains the villages and settlements of Brzezie, Dąbrowa, Grodkowice, Gruszki, Kłaj, Łężkowice, Łysokanie, Szarów and Targowisko.

Neighbouring gminas
Gmina Kłaj is bordered by the gminas of Bochnia, Drwinia, Niepołomice and Gdów.

References
Polish official population figures 2006

Klaj
Wieliczka County